USS Elbour Bay refers to one of two ships of the United States Navy named for Elbour Bay:

 USS Elbour Bay (ACV-66),  renamed USS White Plains before being launched
 USS Elbour Bay (CVE-102), a second Casablanca-class escort carrier renamed USS Attu (CVE-102) before being laid down

United States Navy ship names